NATO Review is a magazine of the North Atlantic Treaty Organization (NATO) that has been published for over 60 years.

History 
It was originally published in print by the Atlantic Council of the United States as the NATO Letter, but in 1975 was taken over by NATO under its modern name. While in print it was a bi-monthly periodical, but now it produces content electronically. The magazine is published by NATO in both English and French, with editions in other NATO Languages.

At present the Editor is Vicki Nielsen. Its website states that the magazine does not necessarily represent official opinion or policy of NATO or its member governments.

References

External links 

Library of Congress page

NATO
Military magazines published in the United States
Political magazines published in the United States